John Leach (17 October 1846 – 1 February 1893) was an English cricketer. Leach was a right-handed batsman. He was born at Rochdale, Lancashire.

Leach made his first-class cricket debut for Lancashire County Cricket Club against Middlesex in 1866 at Old Trafford. He made two further first-class appearances in 1866, against Middlesex in the return fixture at the Cattle Market Ground, Islington, and Surrey at The Oval. He made his next first-class appearance ten years later against Kent at Castleton Cricket Club Ground, Rochdale and a final appearance the following season against MCC at Lord's. In his five first-class matches, he scored a total of 103 runs at an average of 11.44, and a highest score of 34 runs.

His died at the town of his birth on 1 February 1893. His brothers, William, Harold, Robert and Roger, all played first-class cricket.

References

External links

1846 births
1893 deaths
Cricketers from Rochdale
English cricketers
Lancashire cricketers